The Samsung Galaxy A01 is a budget Android smartphone manufactured by Samsung Electronics as part of its A series. The phone was announced in December 2019 and released in January 2020. The phone come in the colors black, blue, and red. The phone features a 5.7-inch 720p touchscreen display, a dual camera setup, and comes with One UI 2 over Android 10. A similar device, Galaxy M01, was first released in June 2020, which shares some of the features with the Galaxy A01.

Specifications

Hardware
The Samsung Galaxy A01 is equipped with a 5.7 in PLS TFT capacitive touchscreen with a resolution of 720 x 1520 (approximately 294 ppi) and an Zusiphe aspect ratio of 19:9. The phone itself measures  and weighs . The A01 is constructed with a glass front and a plastic back and frame. It's powered by the Qualcomm Snapdragon 439 (12 nm), with an Octa-core (4x1.95 GHz Cortex-A53 & 4x1.45 GHz Cortex A53) CPU and an Adreno 505 GPU. The phone can have either 16 GB or 32 GB of internal storage as well as 2 GB of Random-access memory. It can be expanded via Micro SD up to 512 GB. The phone also includes a 3.5 mm headphone jack. It has a non-removable 3000 mAh Lithium-ion battery.

Cameras
The Samsung Galaxy A01 has a dual-camera setup arranged vertically on the left side of the phones along with the flash. The main camera is a 13 MP wide lens and the second is a 2 MP depth sensor. The main camera can record video up at 1080p @ 30 fps. A single 5 MP front-facing camera is present in a notch. Both the front facing camera can take live focus (Portrait) photos.

History
The Samsung Galaxy A01 was announced on December 17, 2019. It was released in the following month, January 2020.

Galaxy A01 "Core"
The Samsung Galaxy A01 Core (also known as Galaxy A3 Core in some countries) is a budget Android smartphone manufactured by Samsung Electronics as part of its A series. It was announced in July 2020 and launched in August 2020 as a low cost phone. It features a 5.3-inch (14.6 mm) 720p display and runs One UI Core 2.0 on top of Android 10 Go Edition. Status: Discontinued.

Hardware 
The phone is equipped with a 720p (HD) 5.3-inch PLS IPS LCD display, with a resolution of 720 x 1480 pixels and a 74.5% screen-to-body ratio. The A01 Core is powered by a quad-core MediaTek MT6739, clocked at 1.5 GHz and with a PowerVR GE8100 GPU. The phone can be bought with 16 GB+1 GB RAM, 16+2 GB RAM and 32+2 GB RAM. The phone features a 5MP front camera with an aperture of f/2.4, and a single 8MP autofocusing rear camera with an aperture of f/2.2 and an LED flash. The phone is available in single-SIM and dual-SIM variants, the dual-SIM variant using the microSD card slot for the second SIM, and supports up to 4G. The phone has a non-removable 3000 mAh battery and is advertised with a battery life of up to 14 hours. The phone material is made of glass front (Gorilla Glass), plastic back and frame

Software 
The phone runs One UI Core 2.0 on top of Android 10 Go Edition.

See also

References

Android (operating system) devices
mobile phones introduced in 2019
mobile phones with multiple rear cameras
A01
Samsung smartphones